Noel is a 1988 album by Latin freestyle artist Noel, released both in LP and CD formats. The album contains four singles, and reached #126 on the Billboard 200.

The first single, "Silent Morning", is his most successful single to date. It reached #47 on the Billboard Hot 100 in 1987. The second single, "Like a Child", also became very popular and was his first single to reach the top position on the Hot Dance Music/Club Play chart. The third single from the album, "Out of Time" did not enter the Billboard Hot 100 but was the second single to reach the top of the Hot Dance Music/Club Play chart and the last to participate. The fourth single, "Change", also had similar success as the previous singles.

Track listing 

Edition Japan

Charts
Album - Billboard (United States)

Singles - Billboard (United States)

References

1988 debut albums
Noel Pagan albums
4th & B'way Records albums